Capital punishment is a legal penalty in Yemen.

Yemen has one of the highest execution rates per capita in the world. Capital punishment is typically carried out by shooting, and occasionally in public. In addition to being the only individual in the country with the authority to grant clemency, the President of Yemen must ratify all executions passed down by any court before they are carried out.

Legal procedure
Like most countries, the Yemeni legal system exists within the framework of a three-tier structure. At the lowest level of jurisprudence are the courts of first instance, established to preside over all different varieties of cases. These range from criminal, civil, commercial, personal status, court-martial, and other miscellaneous offences classified as "special cases" under the penal code (e.g., kidnappings, grand larceny). After trials are held at the lower levels of the Yemeni justice system, there is the option for both the defendant and the relatives of the victim to submit an appeal to an intermediate-level appellate court, which has broad powers to elevate or commute sentences at its discretion. Finally, if legal disputes still remain, then the issue is brought to the Supreme Court of Yemen as a last resort. There are no jury trials in the country, and cases are only adjudicated by individual judges.

Although the Yemeni constitution arranges for the separation of powers between different branches of government, the judiciary is subordinate to the executive branch in practice. The Supreme Judicial Council (SJC) is a small committee established by the federal government to oversee matters pertaining to the Yemeni legal system. The SJC, which is accountable only to the President of Yemen, can directly appoint or dismiss judges without any judicial oversight. In addition, the President must ratify all death sentences before they are carried out, and is the only person in the country with the authority to enact a stay of execution.

Yemen applies Sharia law, which serves as the basis for all legislation in the country. Many nonviolent capital offences, such as homosexuality or blasphemy, are at least partially derived from a strict interpretation of select Quranic verses. Another facet of Islamic jurisprudence recognized in Yemeni courts is Qisas. As a means of legal retribution, the relatives of a murder victim have the option to either demand the death penalty for the accused party, or to pardon them for their crimes. However, the extent to which this is actually enforced remains a subject for dispute, as the Yemeni justice system has allegedly performed executions despite objections from the families of murder victims. Conversely, death sentences have been reapplied after an initial pardon issued by the President as a result of pressure from relatives.

Capital crimes 
Capital crimes includes violent acts like murder, rape, or terrorism, but the death penalty can also theoretically be used in cases of Islamic or "Hudud" offences under Sharia law such as adultery, sexual misconduct, sodomy, prostitution, blasphemy and apostasy. Kidnapping, violent robbery, drug trafficking, banditry, destruction of property leading to death, certain military offenses (e.g. cowardice, desertion), perjury causing wrongful execution, espionage and treason carry a possible death sentence as well.

Methods
Shooting is the only form of execution currently known to be used in Yemen. Stoning, hanging, and beheading are also permitted within the Yemeni penal code; however, stoning is not known to have been carried out for centuries.

The standard procedure for execution is to lie the defendant face-down on the ground or on a rug or blanket. Afterwards, a single executioner armed with an automatic rifle carries out the sentence by firing multiple rounds into the condemned person's back while attempting to strike the heart (often destroying the spinal vertebrae), The heart is pinpointed beforehand by a medical professional. In some cases where the defendant is found guilty of an additional Hudud offense, they may also be sentenced to flogging prior to their death. Both private and public executions are permitted in Yemen.

Criticism

The last official execution of a minor in Yemen occurred on 21 July 1993, when 13-year-old Naseer Munir Nasser al-Kirbi and three other men were hanged in the capital Sana'a on charges of murder and highway robbery. Following this, the Yemeni House of Representatives amended its penal code the following year by prohibiting death sentences for persons under the age of 18 at the time of their offense. However, the majority of Yemenis are not issued birth certificates (with a civil birth registration rate of 22.6% in 2006, according to the World Health Organization), and the Yemeni legal system is severely limited in its ability to adequately ascertain the age of defendants at the time of their offense. There are several reports that juvenile offenders continue to be executed in Yemen. One particularly notable case is that of Ibb native Muhammed Taher Thabet Samoum, who was charged with a murder committed in June 1999 and subsequently sentenced to death in September 2001. His sentence was confirmed by the Supreme Judicial Council and ratified by former President Ali Abdullah Saleh. Samoum is alleged to have been 13 at the time of the offense, and the case of his imminent execution was given particular emphasis in a February 2011 European Parliament resolution regarding the human rights situation in Yemen.

In addition to the execution of juvenile offenders, human rights organizations have expressed concern that death sentences are passed after unfair trials. Authorities have at times allegedly extracted confessions through duress, using methods such as severe beatings, prolonged suspension, threats of rape, incommunicado detention and inadequate access to food and water.

Number of executions per year

See also
Crime in Yemen

References

Yemen
Murder in Yemen
Law of Yemen
Human rights abuses in Yemen